Parliamentary elections were held in Equatorial Guinea on 3 and 10 July 1988. The Democratic Party of Equatorial Guinea (PDGE), established the previous year, was the sole legal party at the time, as an attempt at legalising the opposition Progress Party of Equatorial Guinea in June had failed. The PDGE presented a single list of 60 candidates for the 60 seats, which was reportedly approved by 99.2% of voters.

Results

References

Equatorial Guinea
1988 in Equatorial Guinea
Elections in Equatorial Guinea
One-party elections
Single-candidate elections
Election and referendum articles with incomplete results